Al-Ma'un ("Small Kindnesses, Almsgiving, Acts of Kindness, and Have You Seen") is the 107th chapter (surah) of the Qur'an, with 7 ayat or verses. 
۝ WHAT thinkest thou of him who denieth the future judgment as a falsehood?
۝ It is he who pusheth away the orphan;
۝ and stirreth not up others to feed the poor.
۝ Woe be unto those who pray,
۝ and who are negligent at their prayer:
۝ who play the hypocrites,
۝ and deny necessaries to the needy.

Regarding the timing and contextual background of the supposed revelation (asbāb al-nuzūl), it is an earlier "Meccan surah", which means it is believed to have been revealed in Mecca, rather than later in Medina.

Summary
1-2 Denunciation of those who deny the Quran and oppress the orphan
3-7 Hypocrites rebuked for neglect of prayer and charity

Text and meaning

Text and transliteration

Warsh from Nafiʽ al-Madani

Translation

Have you seen him who denies the Recompense?

That is he who repulses the orphan (harshly),

And urges not the feeding of AlMiskin (the poor),

So woe unto those performers of Salat (prayers) (hypocrites),

Who delay their Salat (prayer) from their stated fixed times,

Those who do good deeds only to be seen (of men),

And refuse Al-Ma'un (small kindnesses e.g. salt, sugar, water, etc.).

Topic
This surah is concerned with two of the core teachings of Islam, how one prays and how one gives. The Surah discusses the character of those who claim to be Muslims but are oblivious of the hereafter. These people deprive the orphans of their rights, are heedless to the dues of the destitute, and pray without holding God in remembrance, forgetting the objective behind prayer. Their charitable acts are a display of their false piety, since they do not give for the love of God. The Surah has been so designated after the word al-ma`un occurring at the end of the last verse. Abdullah ibn Masud said: "During the time of the Messenger of God we used to consider ma'un (things of daily use) lending a bucket and cooking-pot."

Ibn Abbas said: "(Those who are neglectful of their prayer) are the ones who delay their prayer."

Conditions of revelation
According to 'Alī ibn Ahmad al-Wāhidī (d. 468/1075), Muqatil and al-Kalbi reported that the sūrah was revealed about Al-'As ibn Wa'il, while Ibn Jurayj reported that the immediate cause of relation was Abu Sufyan ibn Harb's driving an orphan away with a stick.

Placement and coherence with other surahs
The idea of textual relation between the verses of a chapter has been discussed under various titles such as nazm and munasabah in non-English literature and coherence, text relations, intertextuality, and unity in English literature. Hamiduddin Farahi, an Islamic scholar of the Indian subcontinent, is known for his work on the concept of nazm, or coherence, in the Quran. Fakhruddin al-Razi (died 1209 CE), Zarkashi (died 1392) and several other classical as well as contemporary Quranic scholars have contributed to the studies. This surah belongs to the last (7th) group of surahs which starts from Surah Al-Mulk (67) and runs till the end of the Quran. According to Javed Ahmad Ghamidi

Connection with previous surah
In the previous pair of sūrahs – Al-Fil and Quraysh (surah) – it is explained that the tribe of Quraysh has been blessed with the favors of peace and sustenance because of the Kaaba. These blessings should have induced them to worship the Lord of this Sacred House with all sincerity and should have striven to fulfill the objective for which it was built and given in their custody. Surah al-Ma‘un is directed at the Quraysh, and its theme is to inform their leadership, of the doom that has been destined for them because of their crimes.

Connection with next surah
This surah complement the subject-matter of the next surah Al-Kawthar. The first surah presents a charge sheet of the crimes of the leadership of the Quraysh, the characters of the Quraysh chiefs is depicted along with the warning, while the succeeding surah declares their removal from the custodianship of the Kaaba and gives glad tidings to Muhammad.

Notes

References

External links 
Quran 107 Clear Quran translation
 
 The Holy Qur'an, translated by Abdullah Yusuf Ali
 Three translations at Project Gutenberg
 
 "Qur'anic Verses (107-9, 110-112)" is a manuscript that dates back to the 15th century and features Al-Ma'un
 Surah Maun

Ma'un
Alms in Islam